Namir is a town in south-western Yemen. It is located in the Abyan Governorate.

Other Uses

External links
Towns and villages in the Abyan Governorate

Populated places in Abyan Governorate
Towns in Yemen